Fear, Love & War is the third studio album by the American hip hop group Killarmy. It was released on September 11, 2001, through Loud Records. Recording sessions took place at 36 Chambers Studio in New York City. Production was handled primary by member 4th Disciple, as well as Falling Down, Mike "Trauma" D and Rebel Dainja, with the RZA and Divine surviving as executive producers. It features guest appearances from Frukwan, Lord Superb, Polite, Prodigal Sunn, U-God and Madam Scheez. The album features the singles "Feel It" b/w "Militant" and "Street Monopoly" b/w "Monster".

While the album did not sell as well as the group's first two efforts, it received some critical acclaim, partly due to more mature and personal lyrical content, providing balance to the group's dark production, Five-Percenter militancy, and violent combat imagery. The album is now out of print.

Track listing

Sample credits
 "Day One" contains a sample of "Dicitencello Vuje", written by Rodolfo Falvo and Enzo Fusco and performed by Mario Lanza.

Personnel

Terrance "9th Prince" Hamlin – performer (tracks: 2-4, 7, 10, 12, 14, 18, 20, 22)
Samuel "Beretta 9" Murray – performer (tracks: 2, 3, 6, 9, 12, 14, 16, 20, 21)
Domingo "Dom Pachino" Del Valle – performer (tracks: 3, 7, 10, 12, 14, 18, 20-22)
Rodney "Islord" Stevenson – performer (tracks: 2, 6, 7, 10, 12, 15, 20, 22)
Jeryl "Killa Sin" Grant – performer (tracks: 7, 12, 14, 21)
Jamal "ShoGun Assasson" Alexander – performer (tracks: 3, 15, 16)
Selwyn "4th Disciple" Bougard – performer (tracks: 15, 16), producer (tracks: 2, 3, 6, 8-10, 12, 15, 16, 21)
Jamel "Superb" Cummings – performer (track 2)
Lamont "U-God" Hawkins – performer (track 3)
Arnold "Frukwan" Hamilton – performer (track 6)
Samantha "Madam Scheez" Brown – performer (track 6)
Vergil "Prodigal Sunn" Ruff – performer (track 9)
Jason "Polite" Bratcher – performer (track 21)
Marc "Falling Down" McWilliams – producer (tracks: 4, 7, 14)
Nigel "Rebel Dainja" Julien – producer (track 18)
Mike "Trauma" Dewar – producer (tracks: 20, 22)
Jose "Choco" Reynoso – mixing
Joe Yannece – mastering
Mitchell "Divine Justice" Diggs – executive producer
Robert "RZA" Diggs – executive producer
Jamie Story – art direction, design, layout
Bilal Allah – A&R
Saadiq Busby – A&R

Charts

References

External links

2001 albums
Killarmy albums
Loud Records albums
Albums produced by 4th Disciple
Albums produced by the Infinite Arkatechz